Peter Michael Goetz (born December 10, 1941) is an American actor.

Early life and education
Goetz was born in Buffalo, New York, the son of Esther L. and Irving A. Goetz, a construction engineer. Goetz studied at the State University of New York at Fredonia, Southern Illinois University Carbondale, and the University of Minnesota, from which he graduated.

Career
After college, Goetz joined the Guthrie Theater in Minneapolis, where over the course of 40 years he has appeared in numerous productions, including Death of a Salesman, All My Sons, A Moon for the Misbegotten, The National Health, An Enemy of the People, Cat on a Hot Tin Roof, The Matchmaker, Arsenic and Old Lace, Waiting for Godot, A Midsummer Night's Dream, and The Taming of the Shrew.

Goetz made his Broadway debut as John Barrymore in the 1981 Colleen Dewhurst-directed play Ned and Jack, which closed on opening night. Additional New York City theatre credits include Beyond Therapy, Brighton Beach Memoirs, The Government Inspector, The Last Night of Ballyhoo, Macbeth, and the off-Broadway productions The Jail Diary of Albie Sachs and Alan Ayckbourn's Comic Potential.

Feature films in which Goetz has appeared include Wolfen, Prince of the City, The World According to Garp, Jumpin' Jack Flash, King Kong Lives, Father of the Bride, Dad, Glory, My Girl, and The Empty Mirror. His television credits include AfterMASH, Lou Grant, St. Elsewhere, The Facts of Life, Simon & Simon, Matlock, The Golden Girls, L.A. Law, The Cavanaughs, Twin Peaks, Picket Fences, Touched by an Angel, The Practice, The West Wing, Gilmore Girls, Without a Trace, Arrested Development, in addition to numerous television films and mini-series.

Personal life
Goetz married Constance Fleurat in 1966. They have two sons.

Filmography

Film

Television

References

External links
 
 
 

1941 births
American male film actors
American male stage actors
American male television actors
Male actors from Buffalo, New York
University of Minnesota alumni
Living people
20th-century American male actors
21st-century American male actors